In 2010, Arsen Cigars was launched by Arsen Gasparian, a former diplomat and journalist who came to the cigar industry originally as a publisher of the Russian Cigar Magazine, Hecho A Mano.

History
Arsen was founded by Arsen Gasparian, who was once the press secretary for the Armenian Ministry of Foreign affairs and later the founder and publisher of the Russian magazine Hecho A Mano, began manufacturing cigars in 2010. Gasparyan is the CEO of Florida based Vitolier Company and also runs De Los Reyes Cigars, Inc. in Miami, Florida together with Carlos da Cruz, the son in law of race car driver Emerson Fittipaldi.

Logotype

The Arsen trademark, according to the application filed with the United States Patent and Trademark Office, is a graphic representation of the first letter of the Armenian alphabet that transliterates in the Latin alphabet to "Ah".

Arsen Conniosseur Collection
Gasparian released his Connoisseur Collection in June 2011, which is made in the Dominican Republic by Corporacion Cigar Export  and distributed in the United States by the Vitolier Co.

Arsen Pink for Men
The Pink line of cigars are crafted from 100% Dominican tobacco and are rolled in a 3-year-old, shade-grown Habano Vuelta Abajo wrapper.  They are aged for five months and come in four sizes.

Models/Vitolas

References

External links
Vitolier

Cigar brands
Companies based in Miami
Agriculture companies established in 2010
2010 establishments in Florida
American companies established in 2010